Eric Blount (born September 22, 1970) is a former all-star running back in the Canadian Football League and National Football League.

A North Carolina Tar Heel in college, Blount was drafted by and played two seasons with the Phoenix Cardinals. He primarily returned kicks in the NFL. In 1994, he signed with the Edmonton Eskimos and rushed for 1091 yards that season. After two more years with the Esks he starred with the Winnipeg Blue Bombers in 1998, being named an all-star; he led the league in total yards (3816, 2nd best in CFL history), punt return yards (1051), kickoff return yards (1695, a CFL record at the time), rushed for 599 yards, and added 339 more yards on 45 caught passes. He also played 4 regular season games with the Toronto Argonauts and 3 regular season games with the Montreal Alouettes, both in 1999.

On September 15, 1995, against Winnipeg at Edmonton, Blount scored 5 touchdowns, a team record and one short of the CFL record.

References

1970 births
Living people
Canadian football running backs
Edmonton Elks players
Montreal Alouettes players
North Carolina Tar Heels football players
People from Pitt County, North Carolina
Phoenix Cardinals players
Toronto Argonauts players
Winnipeg Blue Bombers players
American football wide receivers
American football return specialists